"Down the Road a Piece" is a boogie-woogie song written by Don Raye.  In 1940, it was recorded by the Will Bradley Trio and became a top 10 hit in the closing months of the year.  Called "a neat little amalgam of bluesy rhythm and vivid, catchy lyrics", the song was subsequently recorded by a variety of jazz, blues, and rock artists.

Recording and lyrics

"Down the Road a Piece" was recorded in 1940 by members of the Will Bradley–Ray McKinley Orchestra as the "Will Bradley Trio" (a misnomer, as Bradley did not perform on the song, while a fourth, the song's writer, Don Raye, did, as well as an uncredited vibraphone player). 

Three musicians are mentioned in the lyrics:

"Eight Beat Mack" refers to the drummer Ray McKinley, "Doc" refers to the bass player Doc Goldberg, and "Beat Me Daddy Slack" refers to the pianist Freddie Slack (a reference to "Beat Me Daddy, Eight to the Bar", a hit recorded earlier in 1940 by Slack with the Bradley–McKinley Orchestra). Vocals for "Down the Road a Piece" are provided by McKinley and Raye.

Influence
In his autobiography, Henry Mancini recalled that "Down the Road a Piece" inspired his "Baby Elephant Walk" for the 1961 movie Hatari!: "I looked at the scene [elephants walking to the watering hole] several times [and] I thought, 'Yeah, they're walking eight to the bar', and that brought something to mind, an old Will Bradley boogie-woogie number called 'Down the Road a Piece'... Those little elephants were definitely walking boogie-woogie, eight to the bar. I wrote 'Baby Elephant Walk' as a result".

Numerous artists have recorded "Down the Road a Piece", sometimes with variations in the music. AllMusic critic Bruce Eder notes renditions by Chuck Berry, the Rolling Stones, and Foghat.

References

1940 songs
Songs written by Don Raye
Chuck Berry songs
The Rolling Stones songs
Foghat songs
Blues songs